The 2016–17 Liga Națională was the 59th season of Liga Națională, the top-level women's professional handball league. The league comprises 12 teams. CSM București were the defending champions, for the second season in a row.

Teams for season 2016–17

League table

Standings

Pld – Played; W – Won; D – Drawn; L – Lost; GF – Goals for; GA – Goals against; Diff – Difference; Pts – Points.
1 Danubius Galați had 1 point deducted .

Season statistics

Number of teams by counties

External links
 Romanian Handball Federaration 

Liga Națională (women's handball)
2016 in Romanian women's sport
2017 in Romanian women's sport
2016–17 domestic handball leagues